Teluk Kemang is a small town south of Port Dickson, Negeri Sembilan, Malaysia. Telok Kemang town is situated at the 11th kilometer on Jalan Pantai. The eponymous beach of Teluk Kemang is the main highlight of the town, known for its fine sands and clear emerald waters. It is the largest and most popular beach within Port Dickson's 11-mile (18 km) stretch of beaches facing the Strait of Malacca. Alongside that, there are so many beach resorts and hotels along the strech of the beach. Other attractions in Teluk Kemang include the Teluk Kemang Observatory, and the Port Dickson Ornamental Fish Centre. The Teluk Kemang Observatory, also known as the Baitul Hilal (Arabic for 'house of the crescent moon'), is one of the most popular places in Malaysia to observe the hilal to mark the beginning of the Islamic months of Ramadan and  Shawwal. Aside of being the place with the most hilal observations, the observatory also houses the most sophisticated telescope in Malaysia and the ASEAN region. 

Teluk Kemang is also accessible via the Seremban-Port Dickson Highway, which links the town to Seremban, the state capital.

Notable events
2000 - Teluk Kemang Parliament by-elections

References

 

Port Dickson District
Towns in Negeri Sembilan